Rafael Victor de Oliveira Furtado (born 9 December 1999), known simply as Rafael Furtado, is a Brazilian professional footballer who plays as a forward.

Career
Born in Taubaté, Brazil, Furtado joined Académica in the Liga Portugal 2 on 8 August 2020, arriving from Paraná Clube. He made his professional debut at 20 September, in a home win against Estoril Praia.

References

1999 births
People from Taubaté
Footballers from São Paulo (state)
Living people
Brazilian footballers
Association football forwards
Paraná Clube players
Associação Académica de Coimbra – O.A.F. players
Campeonato Paranaense players
Campeonato Brasileiro Série B players
Liga Portugal 2 players
Brazilian expatriate footballers
Expatriate footballers in Portugal
Brazilian expatriate sportspeople in Portugal